Theodorus Josephus Jan Nabuurs (born 14 February 1965), better known by his stage name Mental Theo is a Dutch record producer and DJ. He has recorded two studio albums: Back Once Again (2005) and Jumpstyle Madness (2007). He also performs in duo with Charly Lownoise.

Career 
Mental Theo was born in 's-Hertogenbosch, Netherlands. In 2005 his first solo studio album Back Once Again was released. The album peaked at number 61 on the Dutch albums chart. In 2006 Mental Theo re-recorded "Boten Anna" by Basshunter and it was released under the name "Now You're Gone" and alias Bazzheadz. The single charted at number 18 on the Danish singles chart. Initially Basshunter tried to translate "Boten Anna" to English for few times but it was impossible to translate so in 2007 he made his version of "Now You're Gone" featuring DJ Mental Theo. Single was released on 29 December 2007. It was the initial release for Hard2Beat Records label (later Dance Nation). The single charted at number 1 in the United Kingdom, where it stayed at the top for five weeks. It was the first Swedish song at number one on British list since "Dancing Queen" by ABBA. It sold an excess 667,000 copies in the United Kingdom and was certified platinum. It also charted on UK Top 100 Songs of the Decade. "Now You're Gone" also stayed at the top for five weeks in Ireland, made it to number 2 on the Swedish chart, and number 3 in New Zealand (single was certified platinum). On the French singles chart, "Now You're Gone" peaked at number 6. "Now You're Gone" also charted at number 4 on the European Hot 100 Singles. His 2007 second solo studio album Jumpstyle Madness charted at number 51 on the Dutch albums chart. The next single "Say You'll Stay" with Bazzheadz alias was released in 2008 and reached number 21 on the Dutch singles chart.

Discography

Albums

Studio albums

Compilation albums

Singles

As lead artist

As featured artist

Notes

References

External links 

1965 births
Living people
Dutch electronic musicians
Dutch record producers
Dutch DJs
Electronic dance music DJs